Regina Bayer is an American politician serving as a member of the Idaho Senate for the 21st district. Bayer was appointed by Governor Brad Little to fill the seat vacated by her son, Senator Cliff Bayer, who left to become the chief of staff to U.S. Representative Russ Fulcher.

Bayer served on the Health & Welfare and Agricultural Affairs committees during the 2019–2020 legislative session.

References 

Republican Party Idaho state senators
Year of birth missing (living people)
Living people
21st-century American politicians
21st-century American women politicians
Women state legislators in Idaho